The Green Party of Cartago (originally named Green Ecological Party) is a provincial political party in Cartago, Costa Rica. The party follows environmentalist ideas and platform, and is a member of both the Global Greens and the Federation of Green Parties of the Americas. The party also received the endorsement of Costa Rica’s Greenpeace local branch.

Founded in September 2004 by journalist Carlos Arrieta and English teacher Rodrigo Arias, among others. Party’s leaders acknowledge that some of the major parties like Citizens Action, have endorse environmentalist policies in Congress and oppose projects damageable for the environment, but assure the need for a specific ecological party in the Assembly. With Arrieta as nominee to Congress, the party obtained 1,604 votes in 2006 and 2,901 in 2010 with no seats earned. Its best results were during the 2016 municipal elections when it received a strong support in Paraiso Canton earning a seat in the Municipal Council and the Syndic of the central district.

References

2004 establishments in Costa Rica
Environmentalism in Costa Rica
Green parties in North America
Political parties established in 2004
Political parties in Costa Rica